Hurricane Omar was a powerful tropical cyclone that took an unusual southwest to northeast track through the eastern Caribbean Sea during mid-October 2008. Forming out of a tropical disturbance on October 13, Omar initially moved slowly in the eastern Caribbean Sea. By October 15, Omar began to quickly intensify as deep convection developed around the center of circulation. Later that day, an eye developed and the storm began to accelerate to the northeast. Shortly after, the hurricane rapidly weakened to Category 1 intensity. After slightly re-strengthening the next day, Omar weakened to a tropical storm before degenerating into a non-convective low pressure area. The remnants of Omar persisted until October 21, at which time they dissipated to the west of the Azores.

Throughout the eastern Caribbean, Omar affected numerous islands, most of which only recorded minor impacts. Large swells and heavy rains impacted the ABC islands. Antigua and Barbuda sustained $54 million in damages, mainly on Antigua as nine homes were destroyed, several others damaged and many farms were inundated by flood waters. One person died in Puerto Rico after suffering a stress-induced cardiac arrest. The United States Virgin Islands also sustained significant damage, costing roughly $6 million. Numerous boats and homes were damaged and over 100 power poles were snapped. Total losses from the storm were estimated at $79 million.

Meteorological history

On September 30, a well-developed tropical wave moved off the eastern coast of Africa and entered the Atlantic Ocean. Deep convection formed around a prominent mid-level circulation as it moved towards the west. However, the convection diminished on October 2 before entering the Caribbean Sea a week later. Upon entering the Caribbean Sea, shower and thunderstorm activity redeveloped around the low. The previous steady westward motion that the system took across the Atlantic halted as it entered an area of weak steering currents and significant motion was not expected for another day or two. As the structure of the storm improved, it was upgraded to a tropical storm and the National Hurricane Center (NHC) gave it the name Omar.

Located to the southeast of a broad and deep tropospheric trough and to the west of a low to mid-level ridge, Omar took a counter-clockwise turn on October 14. Upon becoming a tropical storm, Omar began to undergo an extended period of rapid intensification as very deep convection developed around the center of circulation. Wind shear around the storm, which was previously inhibiting quick development, weakened, allowing for further strengthening. The intensification briefly stalled as the eyewall eroded and the center of the storm became slightly elliptical. However, deep convection persisted and strengthening was forecast as the storm neared Puerto Rico. Shortly after, the eye quickly became well-defined and appeared on visible satellite images, an indication the storm was intensifying. The chances of rapid intensification were good as the storm featured well-developed outflow and prominent banding features.

Visible satellite images depicted an exposed low-level circulation with convection displaced to the east due to a combination of very high wind shear and dry air. During this phase, convection redeveloped around the center and an eye reformed. Later that day, the trough that caused the rapid northeastern motion bypassed Omar, leading to decreasing movement.

A weakening storm, Omar continued towards the northeast due to a mid to upper-level ridge located south of the system and the mid-latitude westerlies to the north. Late on October 17, wind shear increased once more as Omar tracked over waters below . Around 0000 UTC on October 18, Omar weakened to a tropical storm as deep convection associated with it dissipated. Twelve hours later, while still producing tropical storm-force winds, the storm degenerated into a remnant low-pressure area.

Preparations

On October 15, the governor of the United States Virgin Islands announced the final preparations for Hurricane Omar as he signed a State of Emergency declaration for the territory. Public schools would be closed on October 16. All non-essential workers would be dismissed at 10 a.m. local time. At 6 p.m. curfew was put in place for the same day. Only those with valid passes would be allowed to be out after the curfew was put in place. That same day, a Hurricane Warning and flash flood watch were put in place in anticipation of hurricane-force winds and torrential rains from Omar. The American Red Cross planned to open shelters throughout the islands before the hurricane struck. Sandbags were also being distributed in St. Croix. A large oil refinery, which produces , was shut down and only necessary workers remained at the refinery.

On Sint Maarten, officials advised residents to start all necessary actions to prepare for a hurricane. Residents were told to clear their yards of any debris or lose furniture that could become airborne during the storm, place shutters over windows and doors and assist elderly neighbors with shuttering their homes, and mariners should find a safe haven. A curfew from 10:00 p.m. on October 15 to 10:00 a.m. on October 16 was put in place. Due to the possibility of flash flooding, residents were to unclog and free up all waterways around their homes. Officials also warned people to stay away from areas prone to landslides until the "all-clear" was given. Owners of livestock were advised to have insured that they were secured in holding areas. As a precaution, the water supply would be shut down from 8:00 p.m. October 15 to 8:00 a.m. October 16. Four public areas, St. Peters Community Center, Dutch Quarter Community Center, Genevieve de Weever School, and the Salvation Army building would be used as emergency shelters.

All public activities, flights, and schools were either closed or canceled on Puerto Rico. Eighteen shelters were open on the eastern part of the island. Also, on Anguilla, residents in the Sandy Ground, Valley Bottom, Welches and Mount Fortune areas were placed under evacuation orders. Shelters were opened throughout the island for those in need of shelter. Schools and government offices were also closed and visitors were told to leave the island.

Impact
Omar produced moderate damage throughout numerous islands, amounting to at least $80 million (2008 USD) and one death was related to the storm.

While it was moving little over the south-central Caribbean, Omar brought prolonged tropical storm conditions to the ABC Islands. The high winds damaged roofs on all three islands, and rough seas caused beach erosion and significant damage to coastal facilities. Some rain damage also occurred, with significant flooding reported in some parts of Aruba. Damage in Saint Maarten was mainly limited to beach erosion and scattered power outages.

The island of Dominica suffered severe damage from Hurricane Omar. The village of Scotts Head, with a population of 450, was cut off from the rest of the country as roads were extensively damaged. The village also suffered water losses, electricity shortage, and landline telephones were cut off. Ports throughout the country were severely damaged. All barge access for hauling sand and stones were destroyed. The airport also sustained some damage. Seven boats ran aground during the storm. Minor damage was reported in Anguilla. Two hotels sustained roof damage, downed treed knocked down power lines causing scattered power outages, and the rough seas caused severe beach erosion. Three cargo ships and seven boats ran aground and two other boats sank.

Nine homes were destroyed and several landslides were reported. No fatalities were associated with Omar, and only a few sustained minor injuries. The most severe damage was dealt to roads and agriculture due to flooding. Seventy-five people were forced to evacuate to shelters as their homes were flooded. Several farms were washed away, including their livestock. Numerous farmers lost their harvest due to flooding. Damages in Barbuda were estimated at $18 million. Agricultural losses in Antigua amounted to around $11 million (2008 USD) and property damage amounted to $25 million.

In Puerto Rico, a man died after he collapsed from cardiac arrest while trying to install storm shutters on his home. As a tropical wave, the precedent to Omar produced heavy rains over the island, causing minor flooding. After passing by Puerto Rico a second time, Omar produced locally heavy rains, which caused minor street flooding.

About 400 ships broke lose from the docks, 200 of which lost their anchors. Three people needed to be rescued when their ship struck a reef and began to sink. Most of the islands 55,000 residents were without power as over 100 utility poles were destroyed. Damages on the island were estimated at $700,000 with another $1 million in clean-up costs. St. Thomas, one of the hardest hit islands, was left completely without power in the wake of the hurricane. All of the major intersections were shut down as traffic lights were either on the ground or without power. Damages on the island totaled to $5.3 million.

In the Gros Islet Quarter on St. Lucia, rough seas damaged a jetty and grounded a yacht. In Soufrière, four homes were destroyed by the storm surge, which also made some areas impassible. The storm surge also flooded parts of the Anse la Raye Quarter, leading to officials declaring a mandatory evacuation of the area. On Montserrat, very little damage was reported. A few minor landslides occurred in rural areas; no impact was caused by them. On Nevis there was relatively little damage although the beachfront part of the Four Seasons Resort was severely damaged and was subsequently closed for an extended period. Throughout St. Kitts and Nevis, damage was estimated at $19 million.

Aftermath

The damage dealt to the agricultural sector of Antigua and Barbuda fueled major concerns for "food security" in 2009. The government allocated about $33,897,420 to help develop and repair the industry. Significant expansions of croplands were discussed,  area, to help promote growth of the sector.

On October 29, in the wake of Omar, President George W. Bush signed a major disaster declaration for the United States Virgin Islands, allowing public aid to assist the islands. The Federal Emergency Management Agency or FEMA, had received 60 requests for public assistance throughout the area. Monetary value for the assistance was estimated at $3 million and growing. Twenty-five departments and agencies were approved of for federal support, namely the U.S. V.I. Department of Public Works. Several non-profit organizations also received support from FEMA, while those that did not meet the criteria were referred to the Small Business Administration's low-interest loan program.

On Dominica, Omar's close pass to the island left 30 families homeless and severely hampered the fishing community. On December 15, the Board of Directors of the Caribbean Development Bank approved $9.16 million for assistance to those affected by Omar on the island and to restore the infrastructure damaged by the hurricane. On December 18, the government of Dominica invested $4 million in aid for the fishing communities impacted by Omar. A total of 140 fishermen were provided with $250 per week for a total of four weeks. Sixty-two of which continued to receive funds due to their circumstances. The government also purchased 121 boat engines to distribute to fishers. Another $794,000 was spent to repair 47 boats and construct another 28 that had been damaged or destroyed by Omar. The government also bought replacement fishing gear.

See also

Tropical cyclones in 2008
List of South America tropical cyclones
List of Category 4 Atlantic hurricanes
Hurricane Klaus (1984) – took a similar unusual west-to-northeast track in Puerto Rico and northern Leeward Islands.
Hurricane Lenny (1999) – was the last unusual west-to-east track in the Caribbean sea.

References

External links

 National Hurricane Center Website

2008 in the Caribbean
2008 Atlantic hurricane season
Category 4 Atlantic hurricanes
Hurricanes in the United States Virgin Islands
Hurricanes in the British Virgin Islands
Hurricanes in the Leeward Islands
Hurricanes in Saint Martin (island)
Hurricanes in Antigua and Barbuda
History of Barbuda
Hurricanes in the ABC Islands
Omar